Mick Cain (born August 4, 1978, in Chicago, Illinois) is an American actor. He is most notable for his roles on American daytime soap operas. He played the part of C. J. Garrison on the CBS soap opera The Bold and the Beautiful from 1997 to 2001, 2002 to 2003 (contract status) and in 2004, 2007, 2010 and 2017 (recurring). He also portrayed Richard Harrington in the horror movie Dead End.

Mick Cain played Jesse Fleiss in The Making of a Hollywood Madam about the persecution of the Fleiss family.

Mick Cain is married to former colleague Schae Harrison (she played a secretary, Darla Forrester, on The Bold and The Beautiful). The couple got married in 2001 and have a son.

External links

American male soap opera actors
Male actors from Illinois
1980 births
Living people